Jeong Hye-yoon (Korean: 정혜윤; born October 1, 1996) known as Heyoon Jeong,  is a South Korean dancer, singer, rapper and choreographer. She represented South Korea in the global pop group Now United . Heyoon announced her departure from the pop group in March 3rd of 2023. Before joining Now United, she was known for her choreography videos on YouTube.

Biography 
Heyoon was born in Daejeon, South Korea on October 1, 1996. At the age of three, Heyoon started practicing ballet. A few years later, she decided that she wanted to become a musician. In 2015, she moved to Seoul to pursue a professional career in the music industry.

Career

2015–present: Early career and Now United
Before joining the group, Heyoon, was a dance instructor at 1MILLION Dance Studio in South Korea.

On November 15, 2017, Heyoon was revealed as part of the final lineup for global pop group Now United. In December of the same year, the group released their first single, "Summer in the City".

In August 2020, the single "Nobody Fools Me Twice" was released. Heyoon states the release of the single to being one of her biggest highlights as a member of the group, as the song is entirely in Korean. On September 18, 2020, the music video for "The Weekend's Here" was released. The track features Heyoon along with Sofya, Sina, and Savannah. She served as the co-director for the music video, along with Dima Kovalchuk. On September 30, 2020, Now United released the music video for a song called "Somebody", where one of the clip's directors is Heyoon again.

Discography

Filmography

Music videos

References

External links 
 

1996 births
Living people
People from Daejeon
South Korean women singers
South Korean female dancers
XIX Entertainment artists
Now United members